Deni Bown is a writer from Norfolk, England. She is also a photographer and consultant and has a special interest in herbs and gardening. She has travelled to remote places worldwide for research in order to write many books on plants. Bown is a self-taught botanist, and had pursued a career in horticulture (organic smallholding, growing orchids and herbs) before taking up writing. In 1997, after working for several years as a council member, she became chairman of The Herb Society of America.

Selective Bibliography

Awards and recognition

References 

English women writers
Living people
Year of birth missing (living people)
People from Breckland District